In Greek mythology Diomedeia (Ancient Greek: Διομήδεια) is a name  that may refer to:

Persons:

Diomedeia, same as Diomede
Diomedeia, possible mother of Protesilaus and possibly Podarces by Iphiclus.

Place:

Diomedeia is also the name of a city in Daunia.

Notes

References 

 Gaius Julius Hyginus, Fabulae from The Myths of Hyginus translated and edited by Mary Grant. University of Kansas Publications in Humanistic Studies. Online version at the Topos Text Project.
 Stephanus of Byzantium, Stephani Byzantii Ethnicorum quae supersunt, edited by August Meineike (1790-1870), published 1849. A few entries from this important ancient handbook of place names have been translated by Brady Kiesling. Online version at the Topos Text Project.

Women in Greek mythology
Characters in Greek mythology